Gonzalo Maldonado may refer to:
Gonzalo Maldonado (bishop) (died 1530), Spanish Roman Catholic bishop
Gonzalo Maldonado (footballer) (born 1994), Peruvian football player